Sodium/myo-inositol cotransporter is a protein that in humans is encoded by the SLC5A3 gene.

Expression of the myo-inositol transport protein is regulated by osmotic stress.

See also
 Solute carrier family

References

Further reading

Solute carrier family